The 1934 AAA Championship Car season consisted of four races, beginning in Speedway, Indiana on May 30 and concluding in Inglewood, California on December 23.  The AAA National Champion and Indianapolis 500 winner was Bill Cummings.

Schedule and results

Leading National Championship standings

References

See also
 1934 Indianapolis 500

AAA Championship Car season
AAA Championship Car
1934 in American motorsport